A Few Images (Algumas Imagens) is the 2014 album by the Lebanese musician Tania Saleh. The album was crowdfunded using Zoomaal. It was distributed by Kirkelig Kulturverksted and Valley Entertainment.

Track listing

References

External links
 Valley Entertainment (western release)
 Kirkelig Kulturverksted (eastern release)

2014 albums